Nash or NASH may refer to:

Places

United Kingdom
Nash, Buckinghamshire
Nash, London, a hamlet near Keston in the London Borough of Bromley
Nash, Newport, Wales
Nash, south Shropshire, a small village and parish in southern Shropshire
Nash, Telford and Wrekin, a "lost" village near Wrockwardine, Shropshire
Nash Lee, Buckinghamshire
Nash Mills, Hertfordshire
Nash Point, a headland in the Vale of Glamorgan

United States
Nash, California, former name of Nashmead
Nash, North Dakota
Nash, Oklahoma
Nash, Texas
Nash County, North Carolina
Nashville, Tennessee, United States, nicknamed "Nash Vegas"

Other places
Nash, Iran

People

Surname
Nash (surname)

Given name or nickname

Nash Aguas (born 1998), Filipino actor
Nash Buckingham (1880–1971), American author and conservationist
Nash Candelaria (born 1928), American novelist
Nash Edgerton (born 1973), Australian film director and stuntman
Nash Grier (born 1997), American social media personality and actor
Nash Grose (1740–1814), British judge
Nash Higgins (1896–1984), American football player and coach
Nash Kato (born 1965)
Nash Rawiller (born 1974), Australian jockey
Nash Roberts (1918–2010), American meteorologist
Nash Turner (1881–1937), American jockey 
Nash Winstead (1925–2008), American university administrator

Stage name or assumed name
Nash the Slash (1948–2014), Canadian rock musician

Arts, entertainment, and media

Fictional characters
Nash, the Japanese name of Street Fighter character Charlie
Nash Brennan, a character from the television soap One Life to Live
Nash Bridges, a character on the eponymous American television show
Nash Gorey, a character from M.A.S.K.
Nash Latkje, a character from Genso Suikogaidejkkn Vol.1 and Suikoden III
Nash, a roadside diner waitress from the 1986 film The Hitcher
Harrison "Nash" Wells, a character from The Flash

Other arts, entertainment, and media
NASH (band), former name of the Spanish boy band D'NASH
Nash (brand), an American country music media brand owned by Cumulus Media
Nash (sculpture), a 1978–1979 outdoor work by Lee Kelly in Portland, Oregon, US
Hex (board game) or Nash, a board game played on hexagonal tiles

Brands and enterprises

Automobiles

Makes and models
Frazer Nash, manufactured by Frazer-Nash Limited, later called AFN Limited
Nash Metropolitan
Nash-Healey

Manufacturers
Frazer-Nash Research, an electric and hybrid vehicle company
Nash Ambassador
Nash Kelvinator
Nash Motors

Other brands and enterprises
Nash & Thompson, an aircraft equipment manufacturer
 Nash Format, a publishing house based in Kyiv, Ukraine

Medicine
Non-alcoholic steatohepatitis, a liver disease

Science and mathematics
Gamma2 Sagittarii, a star also known as Nash
John Forbes Nash Jr. (1928 - 2015), American mathematician, known for :
 Nash bargaining game, two-person bargaining problem studies 
Nash embedding theorems, stating that every Riemannian manifold can be isometrically embedded into some Euclidean space
Nash equilibrium, a game theory solution
Sodium hydrosulfide (NaSH)

Other uses
Nash (tugboat)
North Allegheny Senior High, a high school in Wexford, Pennsylvania, US

See also
Gnash (disambiguation)
Justice Nash (disambiguation)